Abhishek Das (born 15 November 1993) is an Indian professional footballer who plays as a right back for Madan Maharaj.

Club career

East Bengal
Das began playing football from the age of 4 and eventually joined the Tata Football Academy. In 2010, Das graduated from the Tata Football Academy and signed for East Bengal of the I-League but was then sent on loan to Pailan Arrows, then known as the AIFF XI. After spending the 2010–11 at Arrows, he returned to East Bengal. The 2011–12 season started off well for Das as he was included in East Bengal's 2011 Federation Cup squad. He made his first team debut for East Bengal against Mohammedan on 17 September 2011 during the Federation Cup.

Indian Super League
Abhishek represented Chennaiyin FC for the 2014 Indian Super League. He was retained by the club will also play for Chennaiyin in the 2015 Indian Super League season.

International career
Das made his youth international debut at the under-23 level for India U23 against Myanmar in the 2012 Olympic Qualifiers on 23 February 2011. He then made his second start for India U23 in the next match against Myanmar in the second leg which ended in a 1–1 draw but a 3–2 victory for India on aggregate. He then continued his run with the India U23 team during the 2nd Round of Olympic Qualifiers against Qatar. The match ended 3–1 in Qatar's favor. He was still not done though with the India U23 team as he still played during the second leg of the Olympic Qualifiers against Qatar U23 which ended with India getting knocked out of the qualifiers 4-2 on aggregate after the match ended in a 1–1 tie.

Career statistics

Club
Statistics accurate as of 30 May 2015

Honors

Club
Chennaiyin FC
 Indian Super League: 2015

References

Indian footballers
1993 births
Living people
I-League players
Indian Arrows players
East Bengal Club players
United Sikkim F.C. players
TRAU FC players
Indian Super League players
Chennaiyin FC players
Footballers from Kolkata
India youth international footballers
Association football fullbacks
Footballers at the 2010 Asian Games
Asian Games competitors for India
Mohun Bagan AC players
Chennai City FC players
Gokulam Kerala FC players